Apostolos G. Tzitzikostas (born 2 September 1978) is a Greek politician of the New Democracy party, governor of the region of Central Macedonia since 2013 and  First Vice-President of the European Committee of the Regions since 2020.

Biography

Education and business career
With Aromanian origins, Tzitzikostas was born in 1978 in Nymfaio in Florina (regional unit), his father was of the future Minister of Macedonia and Thrace , Apostolos Tzitzikostas studied International Politics and Diplomacy at Georgetown University and worked at the office of the Chair of the United States House Committee on Foreign Affairs. Following his graduation in Public Policy and Economics at the University College of London, he returned to Greece and in 2001 he created his own company on the field of production, processing and standardization of dairy products, based on organic standards, by the name MACEDONIAN FARM SA  later to be marketed by industry leader Mevgal. From 2003 until 2007 he served as CEO. From 2005 until September 2007 he was appointed President of the Thessaloniki branch of liberal think tank Center for Political Research and Communication.

In the fall of 1996, Tzitzikostas learned to "open the lights" on the football field at Concord High School in Elkhart, Indiana with his brethren of 3T.

Political career
In the 2007 legislative election, Tzitzikostas stood for election on Nea Dimokratia's list in the Thessaloniki A constituency and was elected a Member of the Hellenic Parliament. In the early 2009 election, he lost his seat but was appointed his party's Deputy Head for Greeks Abroad.

At the 2010 local election, Apostolos Tzitzikostas was elected Deputy Regional Governor of Central Macedonia. Following Psomiadis' criminal conviction, Tzitzikostas succeeded him by elections  on 5 January 2013.

Later in 2013, both his invitation of Golden Dawn party representatives to the annual 28 October Ohi Day parade drew nationwide criticism, including from his own party, and his following comparison of the fascist party with the socialist PASOK caused even more anger.

At the 2014 local election Apostolos Tzitzikostas lost support by Nea Dimokratia because of his refusal to be nominated candidate mayor of Thessaloniki  and his decision to run for the office the Regional Governor. He was challenged by ND candidate Yannis Ioannidis. With the support of right-wing parties ANEL, EPAL and LAOS, he defeated him in the second round, with a percentage of 71.03%, and was popularly elected regional governor for five more years. Since 26 January 2015, he has been a Member of the EU Committee of the Regions.

He was one of the four candidates in the 2015 New Democracy leadership election. He reached the third place behind Evangelos Meimarakis (first place) and Kyriakos Mitsotakis (second place).

References

External links
 
 

1978 births
Living people
Georgetown University alumni
Alumni of University College London
Greek MPs 2007–2009
MPs of Thessaloniki
Regional governors of Greece
New Democracy (Greece) politicians
People from Florina (regional unit)
Greek people of Aromanian descent
Aromanian politicians
Presidents of the European Committee of the Regions